Six moments musicaux, D. 780 (Op. 94) is a collection of six short pieces for solo piano composed by Franz Schubert.  The movements are as follows:

Along with the Impromptus, they are among the most frequently played of all Schubert's piano music, and have been recorded many times.  No. 3 in F minor has been arranged by Leopold Godowsky and others.

It has been said that Schubert was deeply influenced in writing these pieces by the Impromptus, Op. 7, of Jan Václav Voříšek (1822).

They were published by Leidesdorf in Vienna in 1828, under the title "Six Momens [sic] musicals [sic]". The standard French forms are now usually used – moments (instead of momens), and musicaux (instead of musicals). The sixth number was published in 1824 in a Christmas album under the title Les plaintes d'un troubadour.

References

External links
  
Performance of the Six moments musicaux by Charlie Albright from the Isabella Stewart Gardner Museum in MP3 format

Piano music by Franz Schubert
Compositions for solo piano
1823 compositions